Agnez Mo is an Indonesian recording artist and actress. She started her career in entertainment industry at the age of six as a child singer and released her debut children studio album Si Meong in 1992, by MM Records. In 1995, she released her duet album and also her second studio album, Yess!, with Eza Yayang by Musica Studios, which their self-titled single was successfully into market. Her duet album was also earned an award for "Best Children Album" in 1999. She released her third studio album Bala-Bala in 1998, by Viva Music/Paragon Record. Her third album make her extension as a Top Children Singer in era-90. Artiscilik.com giving awards to her as "Best Teenager Child Artist" in 1999.

Agnes also became a children's presenter on some shows, including Tralala-Trilili, for which she was named Favorite Female Kids Show Presenter in two consecutive years (1999, 2000) at the Panasonic Awards. In 2001, she played the starring role in the soap opera Pernikahan Dini, for which she won Favorite Actress in two consecutive years (2001, 2002) at the Panasonic Awards. Bintang magazine listed her as "Top 10 Most Shining Star" in two consecutive years.

Agnes signed a record deal with Aquarius Musikindo in 2002 and released her debut studio album And the Story Goes in 2003, which won her number at the 8th Annual Anugerah Musik Indonesia, while being nominated for Best of the Best Album. The album earned her an award in the category of Best Newcomer Female Artist at the 2004 Anugerah Planet Muzik. She also won in Favorite Actress for Cewekku Jutek in 2003 and was nominated for Cantik in 2004 at the Panasonic Awards. In 2004, Bintang magazine listed her among the "Top 10 Most Shining Stars" and Hai magazine  listed her among "Top 25 Hottest Celebrities Under 25" as well as "Top Mind Brand Young Celebrities".

From 2005 to 2011, Agnes released her second studio album Whaddup A.. '?! which produced four singles: "Cinta Diujung Jalan", "Tanpa Kekasihku", "Bukan Milikmu Lagi" and the MTV Indonesia Awards for Most Favorite Female-winning song "Tak Ada Logika". Agnes was subsequently nominated in ten categories at the 9th Annual Anugerah Musik Indonesia, and won four of them, including "Best Pop Female Solo Artist". Bintang magazine listed her as "Top 10 Most Shining Star" for the fourth time in 2006. Alongside her music success, she was honored for her phenomenal new generation in music, by Central Leadership Association of Indonesian Singers, Songwriters and Music Record Producers (DPP PAPPRI). In 2007, Agnes was appointed by the US Drug Enforcement Administration and IDEC Far East Region as an ambassador for Asia Anti Drugs Movement. She was also appointed as the ambassador of MTV EXIT in combating human trafficking in 2010. She released her 2008 mini album Nez and hits single "Matahariku" earned a Best Pop Female Solo Artist award at the 12th Annual Anugerah Musik Indonesia and nominated for Best Video of the Year at the 2008 MTV Indonesia Awards. Agnes' third studio album Sacredly Agnezious (2009) was released and also produced a single "Teruskanlah" which awarded the MTV Indonesia Awards for Best Artist of the Year. At the 13th Anugerah Musik Indonesia, she nominated for seven categories and winning four awards, including Best Pop Album. In the end of 2010, she was selected as one of the international co-hosts of 2010 American Music Awards. She released her 2011 compilation album Agnes Is My Name which nominated for Best Album at the 2011 Intuned Music Awards and 2011 JPopAsia Music Awards. The album was awarded by KFC and PT Swara Sangkar Emas, for her album sold over 1 million copies in 3 months. She has also earned 2011 Nugraha Bhakti Musik Indonesia (NBMI) award from the Minister of Culture and Tourism, and the Association of Indonesian Singers, Songwriters and Music Record Producers for her dedication and contribution, both in thought and deed for the progress and development and preservation of the Indonesian music.

In the United States, the Shorty Awards awarding her as The Shorty Vox Populi Award in 2012. At the Mnet Asian Music Awards, she earning twice times for Best Asian Artist (Indonesia) in 2012 (in Hong Kong) and 2017 (in Vietnam). She has been nominated twice times in the MTV Europe Music Awards, which in the category of for Best Asia and Pacific Act in 2011 and Best Southeast Asian Act in 2014. Agnes has earning five nominations, including World's Best Live Act and World's Best Female Artist at the 2014 World Music Awards.

Anugerah Bintang Luminar
The Anugerah Bintang Luminar (English translation: Bintang Luminar Awards), is an independent awards and has credibility was given for individuals Indonesian superior, which widely known for the work and their contribution in the entertainment and fashion career. Agnes has received one award from 2 nominations.

!
|-
| rowspan= "2" | 2012
| rowspan= "2" | Agnes Monica
| Female Solo Singer
| 
| rowspan= "2" | 
|-
| People's Choice Award
| 
|-

Anugerah Industri Muzik
The Anugerah Industri Muzik (English translation: Music Industry Awards), commonly known by the acronym AIM, are awards to honour the Malaysian music industry, first held in 1993. It is Malaysia's equivalent of the Grammy Awards.

!
|-
| 2008
| "Matahariku"
| rowspan= "2" | Best Malay Song Performance by Foreign Artist
| rowspan= "2"
|
|-
| 2009
| "Teruskanlah"
|
|-

Anugerah Musik Indonesia
The Anugerah Musik Indonesia (Indonesian translation: Indonesian Music Awards), was an annual Indonesian major music awards. They have been compared to the American Grammy Awards and British Brit Awards. The award was formalized in 1997 by ASIRI (Association of Indonesia Recording Industry), PAPPRI (Association of Indonesian Singers, Songwriters and Music Record Producers), and KCI (Copyright Office of Indonesia). It is the highest music awards given to outstanding artists in Indonesia. Agnes has received 18 awards from 43 nominations.

!
|-
| rowspan= "8" | 2004
| "Jera"
| Best Pop Female Solo Artist
| 
| rowspan= "8" |
|-
| "Bilang Saja"
| Best Dance/Techno Production Work
| 
|-
| rowspan= "3" | "Cinta Mati" (feat. Ahmad Dhani)
| Best Pop Duo/Group
| 
|-
| Best Pop Song
| 
|-
| Best of the Best Production Work
| 
|-
| rowspan= "3" | And The Story Goes
| Best Pop Album
| 
|-
| Best of the Best Album
| 
|-
| Best Graphic Design Album
| 
|-
| rowspan= "9" | 2006
| rowspan= "2" | "Tanpa Kekasihku"
| Best Pop Female Solo Artist
| 
| rowspan= "9" |

|-
| Best Pop Recording Producer
| 
|-
| rowspan= "2" | "Bukan Milikmu Lagi"
| Best R&B Production Work
| 
|-
| Best Mix Engineer
| 
|-
| rowspan= "3" | Whaddup A.. '?!
| Best Pop Album
| 
|-
| Best of the Best Album
| 
|-
| Best Graphic Design Album
| 
|-
| "Tanpa Kekasihku"
| rowspan= "2" | Best of the Best Production Work
| 
|-
| "Tak Ada Logika"
| 
|-
| rowspan= "2" | 2009
| "Matahariku"
| Best Pop Female Solo Artist
| 
| rowspan= "2" | 
|-
| "Godai Aku Lagi"
| Best R&B Production Work
| 
|-
| rowspan= "7" | 2010
| rowspan= "3" | "Teruskanlah"
| Best Pop Female Solo Artist
| 
| rowspan= "7" | 
|-
| Best Pop Song
| 
|-
| Best Mix Engineer
| 
|-
| rowspan= "4" | Sacredly Agnezious
| Best of the Best Album
| 
|-
| Best Graphic Design Album
| 
|-
| Best Recording Album Producer
| 
|-
| Best Pop Album
| 
|-
| rowspan= "5" | 2011
| rowspan= "5" | "Karena Ku Sanggup"
| Best Pop Female Solo Artist
| 
| rowspan= "5" | 
|-
| Best of the Best Production Work
| 
|-
| Best Mix Engineer
| 
|-
| Best Pop Song
| 
|-
| Best Pop Recording Producer
| 
|-
| rowspan= "4" | 2012
| "Paralyzed"
| Best Pop Female Solo Artist
| 
| rowspan= "4" |
|-
| rowspan= "3" | "Rindu"
| Best of the Best Production Work
| 
|-
| Best Mix Engineer
| 
|-
| Best Pop Recording Producer
| 
|-
| rowspan= "4" | 2013
| rowspan= "4" | "Muda"
| Best Pop/Urban Male/Female Solo Artist
| 
| rowspan= "4" |
|-
| Best of the Best Production Work
| 
|-
| Best R&B/Soul Production Work
| 
|-
| Best Pop/Urban Recording Producer
| 
|-
| 2016
| "Jatuh Cinta Tak Ada Logika" (feat. The Freaks)
| Best Collaboration Production Work
| 
|
|-
| rowspan= "3" | 2017
| rowspan= "3" | "Sebuah Rasa"
| Best Pop Female Solo Artist
| 
| rowspan= "3" | 
|-
| Best Pop Songwriter
| 
|-
| Best Pop Recording Producer
| 
|-
| rowspan= "3" | 2018
| rowspan= "3" | "Long As I Get Paid"
| Best R&B Male/Female Solo Artist
| 
|

Anugerah Planet Muzik
First established in 2001, the Anugerah Planet Muzik (Malay translation: Planet Music Awards), was an annual music awards were organized by several media companies MediaCorp, Suria, Warna 94.2FM and Ria 89.7FM, to honour for artist in 3 countries (Singapore, Malaysia and Indonesia) who to be outstanding achievement in the regional of Malay and Indonesian music industry. Agnes has received one award from 20 nominations.

!
|-
| rowspan= "3" | 2004
| "Indah"
| Best Female Newcomer Artist
| 
| rowspan= "3" | 
|-
| "Bilang Saja"
| Most Popular Song
| 
|-
| rowspan= "3" | Agnes Monica
| rowspan= "3" | Most Popular Female Artist
| 
|-
| 2005
|  
|
|-
| rowspan= "3" | 2007
| 
| rowspan= "3" | 
|-
| rowspan= "2" | "Tak Ada Logika"
| Most Popular Song
| 
|-
| Best Female Artist
| 
|-
| rowspan= "3" | 2009
| "Matahariku"
| Best Song
| 
| rowspan= "3" |
|-
| rowspan= "3" | Agnes Monica
| Favorite Indonesian Artist
| 
|-
| rowspan= "2" | Most Popular Regional Artist
| 
|-
| rowspan= "2" | 2011
| 
| rowspan= "2" | 
|-
| "Karena Ku Sanggup"
| rowspan= "2" | Best Female Artist
| 
|-
| rowspan= "3" | 2012
| "Rindu"
| 
| rowspan= "3" |
|-
| "Paralyzed"
| Most Popular Regional Song
| 
|-
| rowspan= "3" | Agnes Monica
| rowspan= "2" | Most Popular Regional Artist
| 
|-
| rowspan= "4" | 2013
| 
| rowspan= "4" | 
|-
| Social Media Icon
| 
|-
| "Muda"
| Best Female Artist
| 
|-
| "Rindu"
| Most Popular Regional Song
| 
|-
| 2016
| Agnez Mo
| Social Media Icon
| 
| 
|-

Asia Song Festival
The Asia Song Festival was an annual pop music festival held in South Korea that features artists from 10 Asian countries. Participating artists receive a plaque of appreciation from the Korean Ministry of Culture, Sports and Tourism and ‘Best Asian Artist Award’ from the chairman of Korea Foundation for International Culture and Exchange. This festival is recorded and broadcast by SBS (Korean freeTV), Fuji TV (Japanese freeTV/BS/CS), and 30 other broadcasters worldwide. Agnes was the first female singer in Indonesia invited to perform at this event. Agnes has received three awards.

!
|-
| 2008
| rowspan= "3" | Agnes Monica
| rowspan= "2" | Best Asian Artist
| 
| 
|-
| rowspan= "2" | 2009
| 
| rowspan= "2" | 
|-
| Best Performance
| 
|-

Be Radio Karawang

!
|-
| 2010
| Agnes Monica
| Best Female
| 
| 
|-

Billboard Awards

Billboard (U.S.) 

!
|-
| 2018
| Agnez Mo
| Top R&B/Hip Hop Albums (Heartbreak on a Full Moon) Chris Brown Presented to Agnez Mo
| 
| 
|-

Billboard Indonesia Music Awards

!
|-
| 2020
| Agnez Mo
| Top Social Artist of The Year
| 
| 
|-

Billboard Vietnam

!
|-
| 2018
| Agnez Mo
| Artist Of The Week
| 
| 

|-

Bintang RPTI Awards

!
|-
| 2011
| rowspan= "4" | Agnes Monica
| rowspan= "2" | Favorite Star Advertisement
| 
|  
|-
| rowspan= "2" | 2012
| 
|  
|-
| Celebrity Top Rating of the Year
| 
|  
|-
| 2013
| rowspan= "2" | Favorite Star Advertisement
| 
|  
|-
| rowspan= "2" | 2014
| rowspan= "2" | Agnez Mo
| 
|  
|-
| Celebrity Top Rating of the Year
| 
|  
|-

Brand Ambassador Awards
The Brand Ambassador Awards are an annual awards ceremony presented by Lazada and was first established in 2017, based on a distributed poll on Instagram. 

!
|-
| 2017
| Agnez Mo from LAKME
| Favorite Brand Ambassador
| 
| 
|-

Bright Awards
The Bright Awards is a giving awards for the artist of Indonesian television advertising that was first held in 2016. This awards show has teamed up with MNC Media and Unity of Indonesian Advertising Companies. Agnes has received two awards from 3 nominations.

!
|-
| rowspan= "2" | 2016
| rowspan= "3" | Agnez Mo
| Female Star Advertisement (based on a survey of television viewers)
| 
| rowspan= "2" | 
|-
| rowspan= "2" | Favorite Female Star Advertisement
| 
|-
| 2017
| 
|
|-

Cosmopolitan Reader's Choice Awards
The Cosmopolitan Reader's Choice Awards are an online awards presented by the Indonesian version of Cosmopolitan magazine since 2010, to honour lifestyle celebrities, based on a distributed poll. Agnes has received one award.

! 
|-
| 2010
| Agnes Monica
| The Most Fashionable Women of the Year
| 
| 
|-

Dahsyatnya Awards
First established in 2009, the Dahsyatnya Awards are an awards ceremony presented by the daily Indonesian TV show Dahsyat that airs on RCTI, to honour artists who were more popular/outstanding (Indonesian: Terdahsyat) in music chart. Agnes has received one award from 5 nominations.

! 
|-
| rowspan= "2" | 2009
| "Godai Aku Lagi"
| Outstanding Role in Video Clip
| 
| rowspan= "2" | 
|-
| rowspan= "2" | Agnes Monica
| Outstanding Solo Singer
| 
|-
| rowspan= "2" | 2012
| Outstanding Female Solo Singer
| 
| rowspan= "2" | 
|-
| "Paralyzed"
| Outstanding Video Clip
| 
|-
| 2017
| "Sebuah Rasa"
| Outstanding Model Video Clip
| 
|
|-

Daf BAMA Music Awards
The daf BAMA MUSIC AWARDS is an international multicultural music award show presented by Daf Entertainment based in Hamburg, Germany. It has been created to honor artists from all over the world and at the same time unite the world with something as beautiful as music.This award shall immortalize creativity, unity and enjoyment among the global music lovers until the end of time. Awards are presented to the best and most successful musicians in Europe, Asia and Africa.

! 
|-
| rowspan= "5" | 2017
| rowspan= "6" | Agnez Mo
| BAMA Best Female
| 
| rowspan= "4" | 
|-
| BAMA Best Asian Act
| 
|-
| BAMA Best Indonesian Act
| 
|-
| BAMA People's Choice Award
| 
|-
| BAMA Best Song
| 
| 
|-
| 2018
| Best Indonesian Act
| 
| 
|-

Festival Film Bandung
The Festival Film Bandung (English translation: Bandung Film Festival) was an annual awards ceremony presented by the Bandung Film Forum community, to honour artists, directors and others in film. It has been held regularly since 1987. Agnes has received two awards.

!
|-
| 2011
| Marissa
| rowspan= "2" | The Commendable Female Main Character
| 
|
|-
| 2012
| Mimo Ketemu Poscha
| 
|
|-

Gadis Awards
The Gadis Awards are an awards ceremony presented by the magazine Gadis to honour celebrities, figures, institutions, etc. in entertainment. Agnes has received two awards.

!
|-
| 2006
| rowspan= "2" | Agnes Monica
| Go Regional
| 
|
|-
| 2010
| Most Favorite Local Artist
| 
| 
|-

Golden Panther Awards
The Golden Panther Music Awards is an international awards show that was present to the world's best-selling artists from each major territory in multiple musical genres, including Pop/Rock, Alternative Rock, Country, Rap/Hip-Hop, Soul/R&B, Adult Contemporary, Contemporary Inspirational, Latin, EDM and Soundtrack.

!
|-
| 2019
| rowspan= "3" |Agnez Mo
| rowspan= "2" |Best Indonesian Artist
| 
| | 
|-
| rowspan= "2" |2020
| 
| | 
|-
| Best Asian Artist
| 
| | 
|-

Go Show Awards
The Go Show Awards are an awards ceremony presented by the same-title program and TPI, to honour celebrities in entertainment. Agnes has received one award.

!
|-
| 2007
| Agnes Monica
| Hottest Appearance
| 
|
|-

Hai Reader's Poll Music Awards
The Hai Reader's Poll Music Awards are an online music awards created by the magazine Hai, to honour artists selected through online voting by audience. Agnes has received four awards from 5 nominations.

!
|-
| 2008
| rowspan= "5" | Agnes Monica
| rowspan= "5" | The Best Female
| 
|
|-
| 2010
| 
| 
|-
| 2011
| 
|
|-
| 2012
| 
|
|-
| 2013
| 
|
|-

iHeartRadio

iHeartRadio Titanium Awards

!
|-
| 2018
| Agnez Mo 
| On The Verge Artist ("Overdose" feat Chris Brown)
| 
| 
|-

iHeartRadio Music Awards

The iHeartRadio Music Awards is a music awards show that celebrates music heard throughout the year across iHeartMedia radio stations nationwide and on iHeartRadio, iHeartMedia's digital music platform. Founded by iHeartRadio in 2014, the event recognizes the most popular artists and music over the past year. Winners are chosen per cumulative performance data, while the public is able to vote in several categories.

!
|-
| 2019
| Agnez Mo
| Social Star Award
| 
| 
|-
| 2020
| rowspan= "2" | Agnation
| rowspan= "2" | Best Fan Army
| 
| 
|-
| 2021
| 
| 
|-

Inbox Awards
Launched in 2008, the Inbox Awards are an awards ceremony presented by Indonesian TV show, Inbox, which aired on SCTV, to recognized talented artists in music and entertainment. Agnes has received one award.

!
|-
| 2011
| "Paralyzed"
| Most Inbox Video Clip
| 
| 
|-

Indigo Awards
The Indigo Awards are an annual award were presented by PT. Telekomunikasi Indonesia (Telkom) in 2009, to honour for artist, who have their song used most as ringback tones in all categories of creative industries and provide benefits for society, the environment, and create new business opportunities. Agnes has received six awards.

!
|-
| 2009
| "Teruskanlah"
| rowspan= "2" | Best Female Artist
| 
| 
|-
| rowspan= "3" | 2010
| rowspan= "3" | "Karena Ku Sanggup"
| 
| rowspan= "3" |

|-
| Song of the Year
| 
|-
| Artist of the Year
| 
|-
| rowspan= "2" | 2011
| rowspan= "2" | "Rindu"
| Best Female Artist
| 
| rowspan= "2" |
|-
| Artist of the Year
| 
|-

Indonesian Social Media Awards
The Indonesian Social Media Awards are an annual award event which was established in 2016 by SCTV to honour celebrities who had become a trending topic, due to being the most favorite, and having more followers in various social media. Agnes has received one award from 2 nominations.

!
|-
| rowspan= "2" | 2016
| rowspan= "2" | Agnez Mo
| Female Celeb Twitter
| 
| rowspan= "2" | 
|-
| Female Celeb Facebook
| 
|-

Indonesian Choice Awards
First established in 2014 by Indonesian television station NET., the Indonesian Choice Awards are an annual awards were honoured for artist(s) who had become quality talent in music and entertainment.

!
|-
| 2014
| Agnez Mo
| Female Singer of the Year
| 
|
|-

Indonesian Television Awards
The Indonesian Television Awards are awarded to honour for talent in entertainment and program television, based on social media voting, such as Website, Twitter and Facebook. It was first aired in 2016 on RCTI. Agnez Mo received two award.

!
|-
| 2018
| Agnez Mo
| Most Popular Judge for Talent Search Program
| 
| 
|- 
| 2019
| Agnez Mo
| Most popular Television Star
| 
|
|-

Indosat Awards
The Indosat Awards are a music awards ceremony presented by telecommunications provider Indosat, first presented in 2011. The awards are based on the popularity of a singer, as derived from sales, stage appearances, and radio chart positions.

!
|-
| rowspan= "2" | 2011
| Agnes Monica
| Most Popular Female Pop Singer
| 
| rowspan= "2" | 
|-
| "Karena Ku Sanggup"
| Most Popular Pop Song
| 
|-

Infotainment Awards
The Infotainment Awards are an awards ceremony were presented by SCTV since 2012, to awarded for celebrities who listed achievement and phenomenal work in entertainment.

!
|-
| rowspan= "2" | 2012
| rowspan= "4" | Agnes Monica
| Most Infotainment Celebrity
| 
| rowspan= "2" |
|-
| Most Infotainment Dressed Celebrity
| 
|-
| rowspan= "3" | 2013
| Most Lure Female Celebrity
| 
| rowspan= "3" |
|-
| Most Awaited Celebrity Appearance
| 
|-
| Konser 20 Tahun Agnes Monica Berkarya
| Most Phenomenal World of Entertainment Events
| 
|-
| rowspan= "4" | 2014
| rowspan= "4" | Agnes Monica
| Most Lure Female Celebrity
| 
| rowspan= "4" |
|-
| Most Awaited Celebrity Appearance
| 
|-
| World Achievement Indonesian Celebrity
| 
|-
| Celebrity of the Year
| 
|-
| rowspan= "2" | 2016
| rowspan= "2" | Agnez Mo
| Most Awaited Celebrity Appearance
| 
| rowspan= "2" |
|-
| World Achievement Indonesian Celebrity
| 
|-

Insert Awards
The Insert Awards are an awards ceremony presented by program Insert, to awarded for celebrities in entertainment. Agnes has received one award.

!
|-
| 2011
| Agnes Monica
| Celebrity of the Year
| 
| 
|-

Intuned Music Awards
The Intuned Music Awards was an international online awards ceremony, where fans can cast their votes online for their favourites. For the inaugural event, with over 132.000 votes cast. Agnes has received one award from 8 nominations.

!
|-
| rowspan= "8" | 2011
| rowspan= "4" | "Paralyzed"
| Best Artist/Band
| 
| rowspan= "8" | 
|-
| Best Female Solo
| 
|-
| Best Musical Ability
| 
|-
| Best Music Video
| 
|-
| Agnes Is My Name
| Best Album
| 
|-
| rowspan= "3" | Agnes Monica
| Most Promising Artist
| 
|-
| Best Use of Social Media
| 
|-
| Sexiest Female Singer
| 
|-

Jawa Pos Awards
The Jawa Pos Awards (currently JawaPos.com Readers Choice Awards) was an online awards have first established in 2017 by an Indonesian national daily newspaper Jawa Pos, to honour for public figure in music, film and entertainment. Agnes has won two awards from 3 nominations.

!
|-
| rowspan= "2" | 2006
| rowspan= "2" | Agnes Monica
| Favorite Actress
| 
| rowspan= "2" |
|-
| Favorite Female Solo Singer
| 
|-
| 2017
| Agnez Mo
| Favorite Female Singer
| 
|
|-

Johnny Andrean Awards

!
|-
| rowspan= "2" | 2010
| rowspan= "2" | Agnes Monica
| Favorite Actress (Femina Readers Choice)
| 
| rowspan= "2" |
|-
| The Most Stylish Celebrity
| 
|-

JpopAsia Music Awards
The JpopAsia Music Awards (sometimes JpopAsia International Music Awards or JIMA Awards) are the largest online Asian music awards, with nominees picked by online community. This award was originally created for artists based in Taiwan, Japan, and Korea. Because of that, her first nomination was removed, but she was later re-listed in response to complaints from her fans. Agnes has received seven awards from 11 nominations.

!
|-
| rowspan= "7" | 2010
| rowspan= "8" | Agnes Monica
| Favorite Artist/Band
| 
| rowspan= "7" | 
|-
| Best Female Solo
| 
|-
| Most Promising Artist/Band
| 
|-
| Best Musical Ability (vocal, instrument, etc.)
| 
|-
| Best Use of Social Media (Facebook, Twitter, etc.)
| 
|-
| Sexiest Female Singer
| 
|-
| Most Wanted-to-be Girlfriend
| 
|-
| rowspan= "4" | 2011
| Best Use of Social Media (Facebook, Twitter, etc.)
| 
| rowspan= "4" | 
|-
| Agnes Is My Name
| Best Album
| 
|-
| "Paralyzed"
| rowspan= "2" | Best Music Video
| 
|-
| "Jera"
| 
|-

KISS Awards

!
|-
| 2020
| rowspan= "2" | Agnez Mo
| rowspan= "2" | Best Pop Female Singer
| 
| 
|-
| 2022
| 
| 
|-

KLIK! Awards
The KLIK! Awards was an awards ceremony were established in 2011 and presented by program KLIK!, to honour for artist and clip makers in music.

!
|-
| 2011
| "Paralyzed"
| Best Music Video
| 
|
|-
| 2013
| "Muda"
| Favorite Pop Video
| 
|
|-

LINE Indonesia Awards

!
|-
| 2019
| Agnez Mo
| Most Favorite Female Musician
| 
| 
|-

LINE TODAY Awards

!
|-
| 2021
| Agnez Mo
| Newsmaker Of The Year
| 
| 
|-

Marketing Celebrity Image Awards

!
|-
| rowspan= "4" | 2004
| rowspan= "9" | Agnes Monica
| The Most Boyish Actress
| 
| rowspan= "4" |
|-
| The Most Modern Actress
| 
|-
| The Most Oriental Actress
| 
|-
| The Most Favorite Young Actress
| 
|-
| rowspan= "5" | 2005
| The Most Stylish Image Actress
| 
| rowspan= "5" |
|-
| The Most Boyish Image Actress
| 
|-
| The Most Ignored Image Actress
| 
|-
| The Best Selling Image Actress
| 
|-
| The Most Modern Image Actress
| 
|-

Mnet Asian Music Awards
The Mnet Asian Music Awards (commonly abbreviated as MAMA), was a major annual K-pop music award from Mnet Media. Agnes has received two awards.

!
|-
| 2012
| Agnes Monica
| rowspan= "2" | Best Asian Artist (Indonesia)
| 
| 
|-
| 2017
| Agnez Mo
| 
| 
|-

Mom & Kids Awards
The Mom & Kids Awards are an annual awards were presented by MNCTV and established in 2014, for artist in music and entertainment as inspiration to mother and kids.

!
|-
| 2016
| Agnez Mo
| Favorite Idol Singer
| 
|
|-

MTV Awards

MTV Ampuh

!
|-
| 2003
| rowspan= "4" | Agnes Monica
| Female Artist of the Year
| 
|
|-
| rowspan= "2" | 2004
| Artist of the Year
| 
| rowspan= "2" |
|-
| rowspan= "2" | Female Artist of the Year
| 
|-
| 2008
| 
|
|-

MTV Asia

!
|-
| 2022
| Agnez Mo 
| Mtv Hits: Wonder Woman
| 
| 
|-

MTV Asia Awards
The MTV Asia Awards is a show that gives recognition and awards for Asian and international in achievements in cinema, fashion, humanitarian pursuits, and music. Most of the awards are voted for by viewers from the Asian region.

!
|-
| 2005
| Agnes Monica
| Favorite Artist Indonesia
| 
| 
|-

MTV Europe Music Awards
The MTV Europe Music Awards are awarded by MTV Networks Europe to popular music videos in Europe. The awards are chosen by European MTV viewers. Since 2011, other worldwide/regional nominations have been added. The awards are presented annually and broadcast live on MTV Europe, MTV Live HD and most of the international MTV channels as well as online.

!
|-
| 2011
| Agnes Monica
| Best Asia and Pacific Act
| 
| 
|-
| 2014
| rowspan= "2" | Agnez Mo
| rowspan= "2" | Best Southeast Asian Act
| 
| 
|-
| 2020
| 
| 
|-

MTV EXIT (End Exploitation and Trafficking)

!
|-
| 2010
| Agnez Mo
| Human Trafficking Ambassador
| 
| 
|-

MTV Iggy

!
|-
| rowspan= "2" |2014
| rowspan= "2" |"Coke Bottle" (feat. Timbaland & T.I.)
| The Best Music Videos of May 2014
| 
| 
|-
| Song of the Summer
| 
| 
|-

MTV Indonesia Awards
The MTV Indonesia Awards are an annual music awards were established in 2001 and presented by MTV Indonesia, as chosen by their viewers throughout Indonesia. Agnes has received four awards from 8 nominations.

!
|-
| rowspan= "2" | 2006
| rowspan= "2" | "Tak Ada Logika"
| Most Favorite Female
| 
| rowspan= "2" | 
|-
| Best Video of the Year
| 
|-
| rowspan= "2" | 2008
| rowspan= "2" | "Matahariku"
| Best Artist of the Year
| 
| rowspan= "2" |
|-
| Most Favorite Female
| 
|-
| rowspan= "4" | 2009
| rowspan= "3" | "Teruskanlah"
| Most Favorite Female Artist
| 
| rowspan= "4" | 
|-
| Best Artist of the Year
| 
|-
| Best Video of the Year
| 
|-
| Agnes Monica
| Most Inspiring Artist
| 
|-

MTVU Woodie Awards

!
|-
| 2014
| Agnez Mo "Coke Bottle"
| The Video That Gets On Air
| 
| 

|-

MTV TRL America
Total Request Live (known commonly as simply TRL) is a television series on MTV that features popular music videos. TRL is MTV's prime outlet for music videos. In addition to music videos, TRL features daily guests. The show is a popular promotion tool used by musicians, actors, and other celebrities to promote their newest works to the show's target teen demographic. Agnez Mo has received one awards.

!
|-
| 2017
| Agnez Mo "Damn I Love You"
| Woman Crush Wednesday
| 
| 
|-

Music Rank Extra Awards

!
|-
| rowspan= "2" | 2020
| rowspan= "2" | Agnez Mo
| Asian Performer of the Year
| 
| rowspan= "2" | 
|-
| Asian Act
| 
|-

Nickelodeon Kids' Choice Awards

Nickelodeon Indonesia Kids' Choice Awards
The Nickelodeon Indonesia Kids' Choice Awards is the Indonesian version of Nickelodeon Kids' Choice Awards, held since 2008 in Jakarta. Agnes has received five awards from 15 nominations.

!
|-
| rowspan= "2" | 2008
| rowspan= "15" | Agnes Monica
| Favorite Female Singer
| 
| rowspan= "2" |
|-
| Indonesian Star Wannabe Award
| 
|-
| rowspan= "3" | 2009
| Favorite Female Singer
| 
| rowspan= "3" | 
|-
| Favorite Actress
| 
|-
| Indonesian Star Wannabe Award
| 
|-
| rowspan= "3" | 2010
| Favorite Female Singer
| 
| rowspan= "3" |
|-
| Indonesian Star Wannabe Award
| 
|-
| Slime Star
| 
|-
| rowspan= "3" | 2011
| Favorite Female Singer
| 
| rowspan= "3" | 
|-
| Favorite Actress
| 
|-
| Indonesian Star Wannabe Award
| 
|-
| rowspan= "2" | 2012
| Favorite Singer
| 
| rowspan= "2" | 
|-
| Big Inspiration
| 
|-
| 2013
| rowspan= "2" | Favorite Singer
| 
|
|-
| 2017
| 
|
|-

Nickelodeon Kids' Choice Awards (U.S.)
The Nickelodeon Kids' Choice Awards (U.S.) is an annual awards show on the Nickelodeon cable channel in late March or early April that honors the year's biggest television, movie, and music acts, as voted by Nickelodeon viewers. Winners receive a hollow orange blimp figurine.

!
|-
| 2012
| Agnes Monica
| Favorite Asian Act
| 
| 
|-

Opera Van Java Awards
The OVJ Awards are an awards ceremony were presented by comedy program Opera Van Java and first established in 2011, to awarded for main artist who have appeared as original cast and guest star. Agnes has received one award.

!
|-
| 2012
| Agnes Monica
| Most Tempted Artist
| 
| 
|-

Oz Radio Bandung FM Awards
The Oz Radio Bandung FM Awards are an online radio awards were presented by OZ Radio FM, for talent musician/singer who have listed of 'friendly' in music.

!
|-
| rowspan= "2" | 2017
| NIC
| Most Friendly Fanbase
| 
| rowspan= "2" |
|-
| rowspan= "2" | Agnez Mo
| rowspan= "2" | Most Friendly Female Singer
| 
|-
| rowspan= "2" | 2018
| 
| rowspan= "2" |
|-
| NIC
| Most Friendly Fanbase
| 
|-

Panasonic Awards
The Panasonic Awards is an award presented to television programs and individuals, based on poll results. The poll was originally conducted by the Indonesian tabloid Citra, but was taken over by Nielsen Media Research in 2004. Agnes has won eight awards from 12 nominations.

!
|-
| 1999
| rowspan= "2" | Tralala-Trilili
| rowspan= "2" | Favorite Female Kids Show Presenter
| 
|
|-
| 2000
| 
|
|-
| rowspan= "2" | 2001
| rowspan= "3" | Pernikahan Dini
| Favorite Drama Series Program
| 
| rowspan= "2" |
|-
| rowspan= "9" | Favorite Actress
| 
|-
| 2002
| 
|
|-
| 2003
| Cewekku Jutek
| 
|
|-
| 2004
| Cantik
| 
|
|-
| 2005
| Ku T'lah Jatuh Cinta
| 
|
|-
| 2006
| Pink
| 
|
|-
| 2007
| Kawin Muda
| 
| 
|-
| 2011
| Pejantan Cantik
| 
|
|-
| 2013
| Mimo Ketemu Poscha
| 
|
|-

Platinum Vibes Radio

!
|-
| rowspan= "2" | 2022
| rowspan= "1" | "Patience"
| Most Requested Songs
| 
| rowspan= "2" |
|-
| rowspan= "1" | Agnez Mo
| Top Social Media Mentions, Retweets Etc.
| 
|-

Pop Awards
The Pop Awards is an award for celebrities who inspire the younger generation. The show was first held in 2016, and aired on RCTI. Agnes has received two awards.

!
|-
| rowspan= "2" | 2016
| rowspan= "2" | Agnez Mo
| Fit Pop Awards
| 
| rowspan= "2" |
|-
| Style Pop Awards
| 
|-

SBS PopAsia Awards
The SBS PopAsia Awards has been giving awards yearly since 2012. Every award has been accorded to a K-pop singer or group.

!
|-
| rowspan= "1" | 2017
| rowspan= "1" | Agnez Mo
| Best Solo Artist/Star
| 
|
|-

SCTV Awards
First established in 2001, the SCTV Awards are an annual awards ceremony presented by the Indonesian TV station SCTV, to honour artists who became popular (Indonesian: Ngetop) in various programs. It's based on the audience's votes. Agnes has received three awards from 11 nominations.

!
|-
| 2002
| rowspan= "2" | Kejar Daku Kau Kutangkap
| rowspan= "2" | Famous Actress
| 
| 
|-
| 2003
| 
|
|-
| rowspan= "2" | 2004
| "Jera"
| Famous Singer
| 
|rowspan= "2" |
|-
| rowspan= "2" | Cantik
| rowspan= "2" | Famous Actress
| 
|-
| rowspan= "2" | 2005
| 
| rowspan= "2" | 
|-
| "Bilang Saja"
| rowspan= "6" | Famous Singer
| 
|-
| 2006
| "Bukan Milikmu Lagi"
| 
|
|-
| 2011
| "Paralyzed"
| 
|
|-
| 2012
| "Rindu"
| 
| 
|-
| 2013
| "Muda"
| 
|
|-
| 2015
| "Coke Bottle" (feat. Timbaland & T.I.)
| 
| 
|-
| 2018
| "Sebuah Rasa" [Orang Ketiga]
| rowspan= "7" | Famous Soundtrack
| 
|
|-
|rowspan= "2"| 2021
| "Coz I Love You" [Buku Harian Seorang Istri]
|rowspan= "2" 
|
|-
|"Rindu" [Suci dalam Cinta]
|-
| 2022
| "Coz I Love You" [Buku Harian Seorang Istri]
| 
| 
|-

SCTV Music Awards
The SCTV Music Awards are a music awards ceremony presented by Indonesian TV station SCTV, to honour artists who were popular (Indonesian: Paling Ngetop) in various songs and selling albums. It is based on the audience's vote. Agnes has received two awards from 10 nominations.

!
|-
| 2004
| And the Story Goes
| rowspan= "3" | Famous Solo Pop Album
| 
|
|-
| 2006
| Whaddup A.. '?!
| 
| 
|-
| 2009
| Matahariku (single)
| 
|
|-
| 2010
| Sacredly Agnezious
| Famous Female Solo Pop Album
| 
|
|-
| rowspan= "2" | 2011
| Karena Ku Sanggup (single)
| Famous Solo Pop Album
| 
| rowspan= "2" |
|-
| "Karena Ku Sanggup"
| Most Famous Song
| 
|-
| 2012
| Agnes Is My Name
| Famous Female Solo Pop Album
| 
|
|-
| 2013
| rowspan= "2" | Agnes Monica
| rowspan= "3" | Most Famous Female Solo Singer
| 
| 
|-
| 2014
| 
| 
|-
| 2015
| Agnez Mo
| 
|
|-

Seputar Indonesia Awards
First established in 2011, the Seputar Indonesia Awards are an annual awards presented by Seputar Indonesia and RCTI, to honour important newsmakers and figures.

!
|-
| 2011
| Agnes Monica
| Young Newsmaker of the Year
| 
|
|-

Shorty Awards
The Shorty Awards, also known as The Shorties, are an annual awards event, recognizing the people producing real time short form content on Twitter and other websites. The awards were created in 2008. Agnes has received one award from 9 nominations.

!
|-
| rowspan="5" | 2012
| rowspan="9" | Agnes Monica
| The Shorty Vox Populi Award
| 
| rowspan= "5" | 

|-
| The Best Actress in Social Media
| 
|-
| The Best Singer in Social Media
| 
|-
| The Best Music in Social Media
| 
|-
| The Best Fashion in Social Media
| 
|-
| rowspan="4" | 2013
| The Best Singer in Social Media
| 
| rowspan= "4" | 
|-
| The Best Actress in Social Media
| 
|-
| The Best Music in Social Media
| 
|-
| The Best Celebrity Fashion in Social Media
| 
|-
| rowspan="5" | 2014
| rowspan="10" | Agnez Mo
| The Best Singer in Social Media
| 
| rowspan= "5" | 
|-
| The Best Music in Social Media
| 
|-
| The Best Actrees in Social Media
| 
|-
| The Best Fashion in Social Media
| 
|-
| The Best Indonesia Social Media
| 
|-
| rowspan="5" | 2015
| The Best Singer in Social Media
| 
| rowspan= "5" | 
|-
| The Best Artist in Social Media
| 
|-
| The Best Actrees in Social Media
| 
|-
| The Best Fashion in Social Media
| 
|-
| The Best Celebrity in Social Media
| 
|-

Silet Awards
The Silet Awards was an awards ceremony presented by RCTI infotainment Silet and established in 2014, awarded to celebrities who took part in infotainment programs.

!
|-
| 2014
| Agnez Mo
| Razored Phenomenal Artist
| 
| 
|-

Social Media Award (Marketing Magazine & Media Wave)

!
|-
| 2019
| rowspan= "2" | Agnez Mo
| rowspan= "2" | Female Singer
| 
| 
|-
| 2020
| 
| 
|-

Social Star Awards
The Social Star Awards are an multi-genre international awards were presented by Starcount and was inaugural on 2013, to honour for celebrities whose recognized for their popularity in the world of social media. Agnes has received three awards.

!
|-
| rowspan= "3" | 2013
| rowspan= "4" | Agnes Monica
| rowspan= "2"|Indonesian Musician
| 
| rowspan= "3" | 
|-
| 
|-
| South East Asia
| 
|-

Socmed Awards
The Socmed Awards is an awardfor celebrities and public figures who dominated the popularity of various social media platforms, such as Twitter, Instagram, Blogs, and YouTube. Agnes has received two awards.

!
|-
| rowspan= "2" | 2016
| rowspan= "2" | Agnez Mo
| Celeb Twit Female
| 
| rowspan= "2" | 
|-
| Socmed Star
| 
|-

Star Musik Indonesian Awards

!
|-
| rowspan= "5" | 2010
| rowspan= "2" | Agnes Monica
| Most Favorite Pop Female Singer
| 
| rowspan= "4" | 
|-
| Most Stylist Singer/Band
| 
|-
| "Matahariku"
| Most Favorite Song in 20 Century
| 
|-
| "Tanpa Kekasihku"
| Most Favorite Video Clip in 20 Century
| 
|-

UDOU MUSIC

!
|-
| 2020
| Agnez Mo
| Top Rising Asian Artist
| 
|
|-

Unsigned Artist Hangout Awards
The Unsigned Artist Hangout Awards are an online radio awards for local and international indie music of the genres R&B, hip hop, urban, etc. from US radio streaming U.N.G Radio Station. Agnes has received one award.

!
|-
| 2016
| Agnez Mo
| Most Requested Artist
| 
|
|-

Update Music Awards
The Music Update Awards is an online poll that will reward land musicians and singers who have worked this year and also for their fans in support of their idols.

!
|-
| rowspan= "1" | 2016
| rowspan=3| Agnez Mo
| Celebrity of The Year
| 
|
|-
| rowspan= "1" | 2017
| Best Female singer Of The Year
| 
|
|-
| rowspan= "3" | 2018
| Best Male/Female singer Of The Year
| 
| rowspan= "3" |
|-
| rowspan="1" | "Overdose" (feat. Chris Brown)
| Best Song Of The Year 
| 
|-
| rowspan="1" | Agnation
| Fanbase Musik Of The Year
| 
|-
| rowspan= "4" | 2019
| Agnez Mo
| Best Male/Female singer Of The Year
| 
| rowspan= "4" |
|-
| rowspan="1" | "Diamonds" (feat. French Montana)
| Best Song Of The Year
| 
|-
| rowspan="1" | "Sebuah Rasa"
| Best Soundtrack Of The Year
| 
|-
| rowspan="1"| Agnation
| Fanbase Musik Of The Year
| 
|-

Video Musik Indonesia Awards
The Video Musik Indonesia Awards (Indonesian: Music Video Awards) are an annual awards presented by Indosiar, to honour artists in music, based on audience's vote. Agnes has received four awards.

!
|-
| rowspan="5" | 2006
| Agnes Monica
| Best Artist
| 
| rowspan= "4" |
|-
| Whaddup A.. '?!
| Most Favorite Video
| 
|-
| rowspan="2" | "Tanpa Kekasihku"
| Favorite Video Clip
| 
|-
| Best Actress in Video Clip
| 
|-

World Music Awards
The World Music Awards is an international awards show founded in 1989 under the patronage of Albert II, Prince of Monaco and based in Monte Carlo. Awards are presented to the world's best-selling artist in various categories and to the best-selling artist from each major territory. Sales figures are provided by the International Federation of the Phonographic Industry. Agnes has received one award from 6 nominations.

!
|-
| rowspan="7" | 2014
|-
| rowspan="2" | "Coke Bottle" (feat. Timbaland & T.I.)
| World's Best Song
| 
| rowspan= "7" | 

|-
| World's Best Video
| 
|-
| rowspan="4" | Agnez Mo
| World's Best Female Artist
| 
|-
| World's Best Live Act
| 
|-
| World's Best Entertainer of the Year
| 
|-
| World's Best Indonesian Entertainer (Voted Online)
| 
|-

Yahoo! OMG Awards
The Yahoo! OMG Awards are an awards ceremony presented by Yahoo! Indonesia to honour celebrities in entertainment, based on an online voting system. It was first established in 2012. Agnes has received five awards from 8 nominations.

!
|-
| rowspan= "4" | 2012
| rowspan= "9" | Agnes Monica
| Outstanding International Achievement
| 
| rowspan= "4" | 
|-
| Most Wanted Female
| 
|-
| Most Inspiring
| 
|-
| Most Stylish
| 
|-
| rowspan= "3" | 2013
| Most Talked About
| 
| rowspan= "3" | 
|-
| Celeb with Most Die-Hard Fans
| 
|-
| Most Criticized Celeb 
| 
|-
| rowspan= "1" | 2014
| Most Over-Exposed Celeb
| 
| 
|-

Year end Pinnacle Awards (WPVR NYC Platinum Vibes)

!
|-
| rowspan= "4" | 2023
| rowspan= "2" | Agnez Mo
| Best Solo Artist (2022)
| 
| rowspan= "4" | 
|-
| Best R&B Artist (2022)
| 
|-
| rowspan= "2" | "Patience"
| Song Of The Year (2022)
| 
|-
| R&B Song Of The Year (2022)
| 
|-

Organization accolades

artiscilik.com

!
|-
| 1999
| Agnes Monica
| Best Teenager Child Artist
| 
|
|-

kapanlagi.com

!
|-
| rowspan= "2" | 2008
| rowspan= "6" | Agnes Monica
| Top 10 Most Commendable Artist
| 
| rowspan= "2" | 
|-
| Top 10 Most Kissable Artist
| 
|-
| rowspan= "2" | 2010
| Top 10 Most Revered Artist
| 
| rowspan= "2" |
|-
| Top 10 Most Kissable Artist
| 
|-
| rowspan= "2" | 2011
| Top 10 Most Shining Stars
| 
| rowspan= "2" |
|-
| Top 10 Most Widely Revered Artist
| 
|-

Thetoptens.com

!
|-
| rowspan=2|2013
| rowspan=2|Agnes Monica
| Best Asian Pop Artists
| 
|
|- 
| Top Ten Dancers in Asia
| 
|
|-

AMICA Magazine

!
|-
| 2010
| Agnes Monica
| Adorable Hairstyle Celebrity Award
| style="background: orange" align= "center" |Recipient
|
|-

Anugerah Kekayaan Intelektual Nasional

!
|-
| 2012
| Agnes Monica
| Young of Achievement and Inspirational
| style="background: orange" align= "center" |Recipient
| 
|-

Aquarius Musikindo
Aquarius Musikindo has presenting certificate to Agnes Monica in sixth times for her sales album and singles.

!
|-
| 2003
| And The Story Goes
| Double Platinum Award
| style="background: orange" align= "center" |Recipient
|
|-
| 2005
| Whaddup A.. '?!
| Triple Platinum Award
| style="background: orange" align= "center" |Recipient
|
|-
| 2008
| "Godai Aku Lagi"/"Matahariku"
| 3× Platinum RBT Award
| style="background: orange" align= "center" |Recipient
|
|-
| 2009
| Sacredly Agnezious
| rowspan= "2" | Multi Platinum Award
| style="background: orange" align= "center" |Recipient
|
|-
| 2011
| Agnes Is My Name
| style="background: orange" align= "center" |Recipient
|
|-

Asia Anti Drug Ambassador

!
|-
| 2007
| Agnes Monica
| Asia Anti Drug Ambassador
| style="background: orange" align= "center"|Recipient
| 
|-

BAZAAR Vietnam

!
|-
| 2022
| Agnez Mo
| The most awarded artist in the history of Indonesia
| style="background: orange" align= "center" |Recipient
| 
|-

Bintang Magazine

!
|-
| 2001
| rowspan= "4" | Agnes Monica
| rowspan= "4" | Top 10 Most Shining Star
| 
|
|-
| 2002
| 
|
|-
| 2004
| 
|
|-
| 2006
| 
|
|-

Capital Xtra

!
|-
| rowspan= "2" | 2022
| rowspan= "2" | Agnez Mo
| The Most Celebrated Artist in Indonesia
| style="background: orange" align= "center" |Recipient
| rowspan= "2" | 
|-
| The Richest Celebrity in Indonesia
| style="background: orange" align= "center" |Recipient
|-

Cek & Ricek Magazine

!
|-
| 2002
| Agnes Monica
| Star of the Year
| 
|
|-

Class Mild Awards
The Class Mild Awards was an exclusive award to honour for Indonesian musicians. The winners are selected by a jury of music critics, musicians, and journalists. Agnes has received one award.

!
|-
| 2009
| Agnes Monica
| Talk Less Do More Award
| style="background: orange" align= "center" |Recipient
| 
|-

Composure Magazine

!
|-
| 2022
| Agnez Mo
| Indonesia's Most Awarded Musician
| style="background: orange" align= "center" |Recipient
| 
|-

Cosmopolitan Magazine

!
|-
| 2010
| Agnes Monica
| Sexiest Female Indonesian Singer
| 
|
|-

DPP PAPPRI (Central Leadership Association of Indonesian Singers, Songwriters and Music Record Producers)

!
|-
| 2006
| Agnes Monica
| Phenomenal New Generation Indonesian Music Artist
| style="background: orange" align= "center"|Recipient
| 
|-

Espresso (Entertainment Program of ANTV)

!
|-
| 2009
| Agnes Monica
| Kartini Modern
| 
|
|-

Extravaganza Awards

!
|-
| 2007
| Agnes Monica
| Best Performance Artist
| 
|
|-

Femina Magazine

!
|-
| 2010
| Agnes Monica
| One of the Headline Newsmakers as Proud Achievement
| 
| 
|-

Fortune Indonesia

!
|-
| 2023
| Agnez Mo
| Fortune Indonesia's 40 Under 40 
| 
| 
|-

FORBES Asia

!
|-
| 2020
| Agnez Mo
| Asia-Pacific's Most Influential Celebrities on Social Media
| style="background: orange" align= "center" |Recipient
| 
|-

Gossip Award Infotainment

!
|-
| 2002
| Agnes Monica
| One Million Gossip Actress
| 
|
|-

Globe Asia Magazine

!
|-
| 2007
| Agnes Monica
| Top 50 Most Powerful Indonesian Women
| 
|
|-
| 2018
| Agnez Mo
| The Power Of Woman (Woman in Arts,  Culture & Entertainment) 
| 
| 
|-
| 2019
| Agnez Mo
| Top 99 Most Inspiring Woman Of The Year (Creative) 
| 
| 
|-

Huffington Post

!
|-
| 2014
| Agnez Mo
| 8 Asian Entertainers Who Are Making Names For Themselves In The States
| 
| 

|-

Hai Magazine

!
|-
| rowspan= "2" | 2004
| rowspan= "3" | Agnes Monica
| Top 25 Hottest Celebrities Under 25
| 
| rowspan= "2" |
|-
| Top of Mind Brand Young Celebrities
| 
|-
| 2010
| Artist of the Year
| 
|
|-

Hard Rock FM Jakarta

!
|-
| 2008
| Agnes Monica
| 30 Most Inspiring People Under 30
| 
|
|-

I Fashion Festival
The I Fashion Festival (IFF) are an awards ceremony presented by MNC Fashion, MNC Lifestyle and MNC Channels, to honour artists who have motivated and been appreciated in various categories. Agnes has received one award.

!
|-
| 2015
| Agnez Mo
| Lifestyle Awards in Music
| style="background: orange" align= "center" |Recipient
| 
|-

Indonesian Children Newspaper

!
|-
| 2009
| rowspan= "3" | Agnes Monica
| rowspan= "3" | 100 Most Influential People in Indonesia
| 
| 
|-
| 2010
| 
| 
|-
| 2011
| 
|

Indonesian News Channel
The Indonesian News Channel has presenting awards to artists who had selected as INC Top 5 Favorite Music Videos. Agnes has received one award.

!
|-
| 2005 
| Agnes Monica
| Favorite Female Music Video
| 
| 
|-

Indonesian Wannabe Awards

!
|-
| rowspan=2|2015
| rowspan=4|Agnez Mo
| Favorite Singer Fashionable
| 
| 
|- 
| Favorite Singer Of The Year
| 
| 
|- 
| 2016 
| rowspan=2|Celebrity Socmed Of The Year
| 
| 
|- 
| 2017 
| 
|
|-

Intens (Entertainment Program of RCTI)

!
|-
| 2011
| Agnes Monica
| Most Inspiration Celebrity
| 
| 
|-

Kawanku Celebs Awards

!
|-
| 2013
| Agnes Monica
| Best Female Artist
| 
|
|-

Kementerian Pertahanan Republik Indonesia (KEMHAN RI)

!
|-
| 2021
| Agnez Mo
| Duta Bangsa Bela Negara
| style="background: orange" align= "center" |Recipient
| 
|
|-

Los Angeles FC (LAFC)

!
|-
| 2022
| Agnez Mo
| Captain of The Match
| style="background: orange" align= "center" |Recipient
| 
|
|-

LAZADA Indonesia
Lazada is the fourth-most popular online shopping platform in Indonesia. Lazada Group was founded in 2012 and was acquired by Alibaba Group in 2016. Its markets include Indonesia, Malaysia, the Philippines, Singapore, Thailand and Vietnam.

!
|-
| 2020
| Agnez Mo
| Brand Ambassador
| style="background: orange" align= "center" |Recipient
| 
|-

Madame Tussauds (Singapore)

!
|-
| rowspan= "2" |2022
| rowspan= "2" | Agnez Mo
| Wax Figure
| style="background: orange" align= "center" |Recipient
| 
|-
| The First Indonesian Celebrity Whose Wax Figure
| style="background: orange" align= "center" |Recipient
| 
|-

Metro TV Sampoerna (Program for Indonesian Youth)

!
|-
| 2004
| Agnes Monica
| The Diamond of My Country
| style="background: orange" align= "center" |Recipient
|
|-

Million Awards
Indonesian KFC and PT Swara Sangkar Emas has presenting "Million Award" to Agnes Monica for her album Agnes Is My Name, which sold over 1 million copies (est. 12 times platinum) in 3 months.

!
|-
| 2011
| Agnes Is My Name
| Album sold over 1 million copies in 3 months
| style="background: orange" align= "center" |Recipient
|

MURI Records
The MURI honors the year's most impressive acts. Agnes has set one record.

!
|-
| 2012
| simPati: Dance Like Agnes
| Most Digital Dance Video Collection
| style="background: orange" align= "center" |Recipient
| 
|-

Nugraha Bhakti Musik Indonesia
Began established in 2003, coincide Indonesian Music Day (Hari Musik Indonesia), the Nugraha Bhakti Musik Indonesia are an annual honor awards were presented by PAPPRI and Minister of Culture and Tourism, to highest honour for talent artists whose proved meritorious to the development of Indonesian music. Agnes has received one award.

!
|-
| 2011
| Agnes Monica
| Dedication and Contribution of the Indonesian Music
| style="background: orange" align= "center" |Recipient
| 
|-

Nyata Magazine
The Nyata Reader's Choice Awards are an online awards were presented by magazine Nyata, to honour for artist in entertainment. Agnes has received one award.

!
|-
| 2005
| Agnes Monica
| Favorite Actress
| 
|
|-

Poster Magazine
The Poster Viewer's Choice Awards are an online awards were presented by Indonesian magazine, Poster, to awarded for celebrity in entertainment. Agnes has received one award.

!
|-
| 2003
| Agnes Monica
| Latest Artist
| 
|
|-

Prodo Magazine

!
|-
| 2008
| Agnes Monica
| 20 Personages Who Make Indonesia Proud
| 
|
|-

PT. Pos Indonesia

!
|-
| 2015
| Agnez Mo
| Official Postal Stamp with Agnez Mo Face
| style="background: orange" align= "center" |Recipient
| 
|-
| 2017
| Agnez Mo
| Brand Ambassador
| style="background: orange" align= "center" |Recipient
| 
|-

Seputar Indonesia Newspaper

!
|-
| 2005
| rowspan= "2" | Agnes Monica
| rowspan= "2" | Artist of the Year
| 
|
|-
| 2006
| 
|
|-

Silet (Entertainment Program of RCTI)

!
|-
| 2004
| Agnes Monica
| Most Popular Teen Female Artist
| 
|
|-

simPATI Music

!
|-
| 2012
| Agnes Monica
| Appreciation for 200K Download in 1 month
| 
|
|-

Star Entertainer

!
|-
| 2007
| Agnes Monica
| Star Entertainer
| 
|
|-

Southeast Asia Globe

!
|-
| 2015
| Agnez Mo
| Top five: Pop-tastic songbirds (Singer) 
| 
| 
|-

Tatler Indonesia

!
|-
| 2021
| Agnez Mo
| Asia's Most Stylish
| 
| 
|-

The House Magazine

!
|-
| 2022
| Agnez Mo
| Indonesian R&B Powerhouse
| style="background: orange" align= "center" |Recipient
| 
|-

The Independent Critics
The Annual Independent Critics awards were presented by TC Candler and were established in 1990. It have publishes the world-famous of 100 Most Beautiful Faces List. Agnes has ranked No. 86.

!
|-
| 2015
| rowspan= "5" | Agnez Mo
| 100 Most Beautiful Faces Of 2015
| 
| 
|-
| 2017
| 100 Most Beautiful Faces Of 2017
| 
| 
|-
| 2018
| 100 Most Beautiful Faces Of 2018
| 
| 
|-
| 2020
| 100 Most Beautiful Faces Of 2020
| 
| 
|-
| 2021
| 100 Most Beautiful Faces Of 2021
| 
|

TIDAL (U.S.)

!
|-
| 2018
| Agnez Mo
| Indonesian Celebrity To U. S. Rising Star
| style="background: orange" align= "center" |Recipient
| 
|-

TikTok

!
|-
| 2018
| Agnez Mo
| Most Popular Celebrities On TikTok Indonesia
| 
| 
|-

Trax FM Jakarta

!
|-
| 2009
| Agnez Mo
| The Now Generation is in Action
| 
| 
|-

Twitter

Indonesian Twitter

!
|-
| 2015
| rowspan= "7" | Agnez Mo
| Most Followers On Twitter Indonesia
| 
| 
|-
| 2016
| Most Followers On Twitter Indonesia
| 
| 
|-
| 2017
| Most Followers On Twitter Indonesia
| 
| 
|-
| 2018
| Most Popular Artist On Twitter Indonesia
| 
| 
|-
| rowspan= "2" | 2019
| Most popular hashtags in Indonesia
| 
| rowspan= "2" |
|-
| Most Used Hastag for Entertainment Category in Indonesia
| 
|-
| rowspan= "3" | 2020
| Most Discussed Entertainment Account in Indonesia
| 
| rowspan= "3" | 
|-
| rowspan= "2" | #Agnation
| Most Used Hastag in Indonesia
| 
|-
| Most Used Entertainment Hastag In Indonesia
| 
|-
|-
| 2021
| Agnez Mo
| Most Discussed Entertainment Account in Indonesia
| 
| 
|-

Twitter (Charts Artist)

!
|-
| 2021
| Agnez Mo
| Top 50 Female Top Artist With The Most Followers On Twitter
| 
| 
|-

Twitter Counter

!
|-
| 2017
| Agnez Mo
| Top 100 Most Followers
| 
| 
|-

United Masters

!
|-
| 2020
| Agnez Mo
| Top streaming Artists Of 2020
| style="background: orange" align= "center" |Recipient
| 
|-

VOGUE

!
|-
| 2016
| Agnez Mo
| Indonesia's Biggest Pop Diva
| style="background: orange" align= "center" |Recipient
| 
|-

Womantalk Award

!
|-
| 2018
| Agnez Mo
| Women With The Coolest Hairstyles Of 2018
| 
|

WITT (Indonesian Women Without Tobacco)

!
|-
| 2010
| Agnes Monica
| Kartini Award
| style="background: orange" align= "center" |Recipient
|
|-

YouGov-World Most Admired People (Indonesia)

!
|-
| 2018
| Agnez Mo
| 2018 world's most admired (Woman) – country breakdown (Indonesia)
| 
| 
|-
| 2019
| Agnez Mo
| 2019 world's most admired (Woman) – country breakdown (Indonesia)
| 
| 
|-

Notes

Monica, Agnes
Agnes Mo